Fernand Joseph Désiré Contandin (8 May 1903 – 26 February 1971), better known as Fernandel, was a French actor and singer. Born near Marseille, France, to Désirée Bedouin and Denis Contandin, originating in Perosa Argentina, an Occitan town located in the province of Turin, Italy. He was a comedy star who first gained popularity in French vaudeville, operettas, and music-hall revues. His stage name originated from his marriage to Henriette Manse, the sister of his best friend and frequent cinematic collaborator Jean Manse. So attentive was he to his wife that his mother-in-law amusingly referred to him as Fernand d'elle ("Fernand of her").

Biography

Appearing as Fernabdel since 1922, in 1930, Fernandel appeared in his first  motion picture and for more than forty years he would be France's top comic actor. He was perhaps best loved for his portrayal of the irascible Italian village priest at war with the town's Communist mayor in the Don Camillo series of motion pictures. His horse-like teeth became part of his trademark.

He also appeared in Italian and American films. His first Hollywood motion picture was 1956's Around the World in 80 Days in which he played David Niven's coachman. His popular performance in that film led to his starring with Bob Hope and Anita Ekberg in the 1958 comedy Paris Holiday.

In addition to acting, Fernandel also directed or co-produced several of his own films. His profile was raised in Britain by the 60s TV advertisements for Dubonnet in which he would say "Do 'Ave A Dubonnet"

Fernandel died from lung cancer and is buried in the Cimetière de Passy, Paris, France.

Family 
He had two daughters, Josette (1926) and Janine (1930), and son Franck (1935). His son, known as Franck Fernandel, became an actor and a singer. Franck acted alongside his father in two films, Gilles Grangier's L'Âge ingrat and Georges Bianchi's En avant la musique.

Literature
In The Stranger by Albert Camus, Meursault and his female friend Marie Cordona watch a movie starring Fernandel on the day after the funeral of Meursault's mother. According to Meursault, "The movie was funny in parts, but otherwise it was just too stupid."

Filmography

Selected discography 
 "Félicie aussi" (1939)

References

External links

 
  Fernandel singing 'Les gens riaient'
  Fernandel by Diggi

French comedians
French comedy musicians
Deaths from lung cancer in France
1903 births
1971 deaths
Burials at Passy Cemetery
Knights of the Ordre national du Mérite
Nastro d'Argento winners
Male actors from Marseille
People of Piedmontese descent
French male stage actors
French male film actors
French male television actors
20th-century French male actors
20th-century French musicians
20th-century French comedians